Laiyolo (Layolo) or Loa’ is an Austronesian language of South Sulawesi, Indonesia. It is spoken at the southern tip of Selayar Island and belongs to the Wotu–Wolio branch of the  Celebic subgroup.

Barang-Barang is a variety of Laiyolo.

References 

Wotu–Wolio languages
Languages of Sulawesi